The Southern Amami Ōshima language is a Ryukyuan language spoken in Setouchi, Kagoshima Prefecture, Japan. It is generally considered to be the southern variety of the Amami Ōshima language, whereas a separate northern variety exists.

According to Ethnologue, there are 1,800 speakers of Southern Amami Ōshima. The northern variety has 10,000 speakers. Both of these languages are endangered, as younger generations either speak Japanese or a local variety of Japanese known as Ton-futsūgo.

See also 

 Amami Ōshima language
 Ryukyuan languages
 Amami Ōshima

References 

Ryukyuan languages
Amami Islands
Languages of Japan